The Union Banking Corporation (UBC) was a banking corporation in the US.
Founding member and one of its seven directors was Prescott Bush.
The banks assets were seized by the United States government on October 20, 1942, during World War II under the U.S. Trading with the Enemy Act and Executive Order No. 9095.

Seizure 
According to an October 5, 1942, report from the Office of Alien Property Custodian, Union Banking was owned by Bank voor Handel en Scheepvaart N.V., a Dutch bank. The memo from August 18, 1941, states "My investigation produced no evidence as to the ownership of this Dutch bank."

The Dutch bank was alleged to be affiliated with United Steel Works, a German company. Fritz Thyssen and his brother, Heinrich Thyssen-Bornemisza, had the Dutch bank and the steel firm as part of their business and financial empire according to the government agency. Fritz Thyssen resigned from the Council of State after November 9, 1938 Kristallnacht, was arrested in 1940, and spent the remainder of the war in a sanatorium and in concentration camps.  The APC documents say "Whether any or all part of the funds held by Union Banking Corporation, or companies associated with it, belong to Fritz Thyssen could not be established in this investigation." The assets were held by the government for the duration of the war, then returned afterward; UBC dissolved in the 1950s.

See also 
 War seizures Nazi assets

References 

Defunct banks of the United States
Banks established in 1924
1924 establishments in New York (state)
1950s disestablishments in the United States
Banks disestablished in the 1950s
American companies established in 1924